Douglas P. Drew (July 27, 1920 – May 3, 2005) was an American who played in the Canadian Football League for the Regina Roughriders in the 1947 and 1948 seasons. He attended Minot State University.

References

1920 births
2005 deaths
American football guards
Canadian football guards
American players of Canadian football
Minot State Beavers football players
Saskatchewan Roughriders players
Players of American football from North Dakota
People from Burke County, North Dakota